Bandham is a 1985 Indian Tamil-language drama film, directed by K. Vijayan and produced by Anandavalli Balaji. The film stars Sivaji Ganesan, Kajal Kiran, Shalini and Anand Babu. It is a remake of the Malayalam film Chakkarayumma. The film was remade in Telugu with the same name, with Shalini reprising her role.

Plot 
Abraham is a rich and arrogant businessman. His only daughter, Mary is in love with poor Raja. Abraham disowns his daughter while Raheem helps them get married and supports them. They have a daughter Asha but Raja dies untimely. Raheem manipulates the situation in such a manner that Abraham meets Asha and they slowly start bonding. What happens when Abraham finds out that Asha is his grand-daughter forms the rest of the story.

Cast 
Sivaji Ganesan as Abraham, retired general and Mary's father.
Kajal Kiran as Mary, Abraham's daughter.
Shalini as Asha, Mary's daughter.
Anand Babu as Raja, Mary's love interest.
Nizhalgal Ravi as Thomas, Raja's friend.
Jaishankar as Raheem, principal of Raja's college and Abraham's friend.
Manorama as Naveetha
Charle as Abdul, Raja's collagemate.
Babloo Prithiveeraj as dancer in song "Hey Aatha"

Soundtrack 
The music was composed by Shankar–Ganesh.

Reception 
Kalki appreciated the performances of Ganesan and Shalini, as well as their chemistry.

References

External links 
 

1985 films
1980s Tamil-language films
Films scored by Shankar–Ganesh
Indian drama films
Tamil remakes of Malayalam films
1985 drama films
Films directed by K. Vijayan